Theodoric (or Theoderic) the Great (454 – 30 August 526), also called Theodoric the Amal (Greek: ,;), was king of the Ostrogoths (471–526), and ruler of the independent Ostrogothic Kingdom of Italy between 493 and 526, regent of the Visigoths (511–526), and a patrician of the Eastern Roman Empire. As ruler of the combined Gothic realms, Theodoric controlled an empire stretching from the Atlantic Ocean to the Adriatic Sea. Though Theodoric himself only used the title 'king' (rex), some scholars characterize him as a Western Roman Emperor in all but name, since he ruled large parts of the former Western Roman Empire, had received the former Western imperial regalia from Constantinople in 497, and was referred to by the title augustus by some of his subjects.

As a young child of an Ostrogothic nobleman, Theodoric was taken as a hostage to Constantinople, where he spent his formative years and received an East Roman education (paideia). Theodoric returned to Pannonia around 470, and throughout the 470s he campaigned against the Sarmatians and competed for influence among the Goths of the Roman Balkans. The emperor Zeno made him a commander of the Eastern Roman forces in AD 483, and in AD 484 he was named consul. Nevertheless, Theodoric remained in constant hostilities with the emperor and frequently raided East Roman lands.

At the behest of Zeno, in 489 Theodoric attacked Odoacer, the king of Italy, emerging victorious in 493. As the new ruler of Italy, he upheld a Roman legal administration and scholarly culture and promoted a major building program across Italy. In 505 he expanded into the Balkans, and by 511 he had brought the Visigothic Kingdom of Spain under his direct control and established hegemony over the Burgundian and Vandal kingdoms. Theodoric died in 526 and was buried in a grand mausoleum in Ravenna. He lived on as the figure Dietrich von Bern in Germanic heroic legend.

Youth and early exploits 
Theodoric was born in AD 454 in Pannonia on the banks of the Neusiedler See near Carnuntum, the son of king Theodemir, a Germanic Amali nobleman, and his concubine Ereleuva. This was just a year after the Ostrogoths had thrown off nearly a century of domination by the Huns. His Gothic name, which is reconstructed by linguists as *Þiudareiks, translates into "people-king" or "ruler of the people".

In 461, when Theodoric was seven or eight years of age, he was taken hostage in Constantinople to secure the Ostrogoths' compliance with a treaty Theodemir had concluded with the augustus Leo I (ruled 457–474). The treaty secured a payment to Constantinople of some 300 pounds' worth of gold each year. Theodoric was well educated by Constantinople's best teachers. His status made him valuable, since the Amal family from which he came (as told by Theodoric), allegedly ruled half of all Goths since the third century AD. Historian Peter Heather argues that Theodoric's claims were likely self-aggrandizing propaganda and that the Amal dynasty was more limited than modern commentators presume. Until 469, Theodoric remained in Constantinople where he spent formative years "catching up on all the Romanitas" it had taken generations of Visigothic Balthi to acquire. Theodoric was treated with favor by the emperor Leo I. He learned to read, write and perform arithmetic while in captivity in the Eastern Empire.

When Leo heard that his imperial army was retreating from the Goths near Pannonia, he sent Theodoric home with gifts and no promises of any commitments. On his return in 469/470, Theodoric assumed leadership over the Gothic regions previously ruled by his uncle, Valamir, while his father became king. Not long afterwards near Singidunum (modern Belgrade) in upper Moesia, the Tisza Sarmatian king Babai had extended his authority at Constantinople's expense. Legitimizing his position as a warrior, Theodoric crossed the Danube with six thousand warriors, defeated the Sarmatians and killed Babai; this moment likely crystallized his position and marked the beginning of his kingship, despite not actually having yet assumed the throne. Perhaps to assert his authority as an Amali prince, Theodoric kept the conquered area of Singidunum for himself.

Throughout the 470s, sometimes in the name of the empire itself, Theodoric launched campaigns against potential Gothic rivals and other enemies of the Eastern Empire, which made him an important military and political figure. One of his chief rivals was the chieftain of the Thracian Goths Theodoric Strabo (Strabo means "the Squinter"), who had led a major revolt against the emperor Zeno. Finding common ground with the emperor, Theodoric was rewarded by Zeno and made commander of East Roman forces, while his people became foederati or federates of the Roman army.

Zeno attempted to play one Germanic chieftain against another and take advantage of an opportunity sometime in 476/477 when—after hearing demands from Theodoric for new lands since his people were facing a famine—he offered Theodoric Strabo the command once belonging to Theodoric. Enraged by this betrayal, Theodoric sought his wrath against the communities in the Rhodope Mountains, where his forces commandeered livestock and slaughtered peasants, sacked and burned Stobi in Macedonia and requisitioned supplies from the archbishop at Heraclea. Gothic plundering finally elicited a settlement from Zeno, but Theodoric initially refused any compromise. Theodoric sent one of his confidants, Sidimund, forward to Epidaurum for negotiations with Zeno. While the Roman envoy and Theodoric were negotiating, Zeno sent troops against some of Theodoric's wagons, which were under the protection of his able general Theodimund. Unaware of this treachery, Theodoric's Goths lost around 2,000 wagons and 5,000 of his people were taken captive.

He settled his people in Epirus in 479 with the help of his relative Sidimund. In 482, he raided Greece and sacked Larissa. Bad luck, rebellions and poor decisions left Zeno in an unfortunate position, which subsequently led him to seek another agreement with Theodoric. In 483, Zeno made Theodoric magister militum praesentalis and consul designate in 484, whereby he commanded the Danubian provinces of Dacia Ripensis and Moesia Inferior as well as the adjacent regions.

Reign

Seeking further gains, Theodoric frequently ravaged the provinces of the Eastern Roman Empire, eventually threatening Constantinople itself. By 486, there was little disputing the open hostilities between Theodoric and Zeno. The emperor sought the assistance of the Bulgarians, who were likewise defeated by Theodoric. In 487, Theodoric began his aggressive campaign against Constantinople, blockading the city, occupying strategically important suburbs, and cutting off its water supply; although it seems Theodoric never intended to occupy the city but instead, to use the assault as a means of gaining power and prestige from the Eastern Empire.

The Ostrogoths needed a place to live, and Zeno was having serious problems with Odoacer, the Germanic foederatus and King of Italy, who although ostensibly viceroy for Zeno, was menacing Byzantine territory and not respecting the rights of Roman citizens in Italy. In 488, Zeno ordered Theodoric to overthrow Odoacer. For this task, he received support from Rugian king Frideric, the son of Theodoric's cousin Giso. Theodoric moved with his people towards Italy in the autumn of 488. On the way he was opposed by the Gepids, whom he defeated at Sirmium in August 489. Arriving in Italy, Theodoric won the battles of Isonzo and Verona in 489.

Once again, Theodoric was pressed by Zeno in 490 to attack Odoacer. Theodoric's army was defeated by Odoacer's forces at Faenza in 490, but regained the upper hand after securing victory in the Battle of the Adda River on 11 August 490. For several years, the armies of Odoacer and Theodoric vied for supremacy across the Italian peninsula. In 493, Theodoric took Ravenna. On 2 February 493, Theodoric and Odoacer signed a treaty that assured both parties would rule over Italy. Then on 5 March 493, Theodoric entered the city of Ravenna. A banquet was organized on 15 March 493 in order to celebrate this treaty. At this feast, Theodoric, after making a toast, killed Odoacer. Theodoric drew his sword and cleft him in twain, from collarbone to thigh. Along with Odoacer, Theodoric had the king's most loyal followers slaughtered as well, an event which left him as the master of Italy.

With Odoacer dead and his forces dispersed, Theodoric now faced the problem of settlement for his people. Concerned about thinning out the Amal line too much, Theodoric believed he could not afford to spread some 40,000 of his tribesmen across the entire Italian peninsula. Such considerations led him to the conclusion that it was best to settle the Ostrogoths in three concentrated areas: around Pavia, Ravenna and Picenum. Theodoric's kingdom was among the most "Roman" of the barbarian states and he successfully ruled most of Italy for thirty-three years following his treachery against Odoacer.

Theodoric extended his hegemony over the Burgundian and Vandal kingdoms (along with Visigothic royals) through marriage alliances. He had married the sister of the mighty Frankish king, Clovis—likely in recognition of Frankish power. He sent a substantial dowry accompanied by a guard of 5,000 troops with his sister Amalafrida when she married the king of the Vandals and Alans, Thrasamund. In 504–505, Theodoric extended his realms in the Balkans by defeating the Gepids, acquiring the province of Pannonia. Theodoric became regent for the infant Visigothic king, his grandson Amalaric, following the defeat of Alaric II by the Franks under Clovis in 507. The Franks were able to wrest control of Aquitaine from the Visigoths, but otherwise Theodoric was able to defeat their incursions.

In 511, the Visigothic Kingdom was brought under Theodoric's direct control, forming a Gothic superstate that extended from the Atlantic to the Danube. While territories that were lost to the Franks remained that way, Theodoric concluded a peace arrangement with the heirs of the Frankish Kingdom once Clovis was dead. Additional evidence of the Gothic king's extensive royal reach include the acts of ecclesiastical councils that were held in Tarragona and Gerona; while both occurred in 516 and 517, they date back to the "regnal years of Theoderic, which seem to commence in the year 511".

Like Odoacer, Theodoric was ostensibly only a viceroy for the augustus in Constantinople, but he nonetheless adopted the trappings of imperial style, increasingly emphasizing his "neo-imperial status". According to historian Peter Brown, Theodoric was in the habit of commenting that "An able Goth wants to be like a Roman; only a poor Roman would want to be like a Goth." Much like the representatives of the Eastern Empire, Theodoric chose to be clad in robes dyed purple, emulating the imperial colors and perhaps even to reinforce the imperial dispatch of the augustus Anastasius I, which outlined Theodoric's position as an imperial colleague. Chroniclers like Cassiodorus added a layer of legitimacy for Theodoric and the Amal tribe from which he came by casting them as cooperative participants in the greater history of the Mediterranean going all the way back to the era of Alexander the Great. In reality—at least in part due to his formidable military—he was able to avoid imperial supervision, and dealings between the emperor and Theodoric were as equals. Unlike Odoacer, however, Theodoric respected the agreement he had made and allowed Roman citizens within his kingdom to be subject to Roman law and the Roman judicial system. The Goths, meanwhile, lived under their own laws and customs. In 519, when a mob had burned down the synagogues of Ravenna, Theodoric ordered the town to rebuild them at its own expense.

Theodoric experienced difficulties before his death. He had married off his daughter Amalasuintha to the Visigoth Eutharic, but Eutharic died in August 522 or 523, so no lasting dynastic connection of Ostrogoths and Visigoths was established, which highlighted the tensions between the Eastern Empire and the West. The new augustus, Justin I—who replaced Anastasius, a man with whom Theodoric had good relations—was under the influence of his nephew Justinian; somehow, imperial views hardened against the West and talk of Rome's fall emerged during this period, leading to questions about the legitimacy of barbarian rule. Theodoric's good relations with the Roman Senate deteriorated due to a presumed senatorial conspiracy in 522, and, in 523, Theodoric had the philosopher and court official Boethius and Boethius' father-in-law Symmachus arrested on charges of treason related to the alleged plot. For his role, Theodoric had Boethius executed in 524.

Despite the complex relationship between Theodoric and his son-in-law, the Catholic Burgundian king Sigismund, the two enjoyed a mutual peace for fifteen years. Then in 522, Sigismund killed his own son—Theodoric's grandson—Sigeric; an act which infuriated Theodoric and he retaliated by invading the Burgundian kingdom, accompanied by the Franks. Between the two peoples, Sigismund's Burgundian forces faced two fronts and were defeated. Meanwhile, Sigismund's Arian brother Godomar established himself as king over the remaining Burgundian territory and ruled for a decade.

When Theodoric's sister Amalafrida sought to possibly change the direction of Vandal succession following the death of her spouse, the former Vandal king Thrasamund, the new Catholic Vandal king Hilderic had her, along with the accompanying Gothic retinue, killed. Theodoric was incensed and planned an expedition to restore his power over the Vandal kingdom when he died of dysentery in the summer of 526. The Gothic king was succeeded by his grandson Athalaric, with Theodoric's daughter Amalasuintha serving as regent since Athalaric was but ten years of age when Theodoric died. Her role was to carry out the dead ruler's political testament, to seek accommodation with the senate, and maintain peace with the emperor. Suddenly the once united Goths were split and Theodoric's grandson Amalaric ruled the newly independent Visigothic kingdom for the next five years.

Family and progeny

Theodoric was married once.

He had a concubine in Moesia, name unknown, with whom he had two daughters:
 Theodegotha (ca. 473 – ?). In 494, she was married to Alaric II as a part of her father's alliance with the Visigoths.
 Ostrogotho (ca. 475 – ?). In 494 or 496, she was married to the king Sigismund of Burgundy as a part of her father's alliance with the Burgundians.

By his marriage to Audofleda in 493 he had one daughter:
 Amalasuintha, Queen of the Goths. She was married to Eutharic and had two children: Athalaric and Matasuntha (the latter being married to Witiges first, then, after Witiges' death, married to Germanus Justinus; neither had children). Any hope for a reconciliation between the Goths and the Romans in the person of a Gotho-Roman Emperor from this family lineage was shattered.

After his death in Ravenna in 526, Theodoric was succeeded by his grandson Athalaric. Athalaric was at first represented by his mother Amalasuintha, who served as regent from 526 until 534. The kingdom of the Ostrogoths, however, began to wane and was conquered by Justinian I in 553 after the Battle of Mons Lactarius.

Building program
Theodoric promoted the rebuilding of Roman cities and the preservation of ancient monuments in Italy. The fame of his building works reached far-away Syria. Theodoric's building program saw more extensive new construction and restoration than that of any of the West Roman emperors after Honorius (395–423).

Ravenna

Theodoric devoted most of his architectural attention to his capital, Ravenna. He restored Ravenna's water supply by repairing an aqueduct originally built by Trajan. According to the chronicles of Cassiodorus, a number of cities were renewed by Theodoric's building enterprises, some of which even surpassed the ancient wonders. Historian Jonathan J. Arnold quips:

He constructed a "Great Basilica of Hercules" next to a colossal statue of the hero himself. To promote Arianism, the king commissioned a small Arian cathedral, the Hagia Anastasis, which contains the Arian Baptistery.  Three more churches built by Theodoric in Ravenna and its suburbs, S. Andrea dei Goti, S. Giorgio and S. Eusebio, were destroyed in the 13th, 14th and 15th centuries. Theodoric built the Palace of Theodoric for himself in Ravenna, modeled on the Great Palace of Constantinople. It was an expansion of an earlier Roman structure. The palace church of Christ the Redeemer survives and is known today as the Basilica of Sant'Apollinare Nuovo. It was Theodoric's personal church of worship and was modeled specifically according to his tastes. An equestrian statue of Theodoric was erected in the square in front of the palace. Statues like these were symbols of the ancient world, and Theodoric's equestrian likeness was meant to convey his status as the undisputed ruler of the western empire.

Theodoric the Great was interred in Ravenna, but his bones were scattered and his mausoleum was converted to a church after Belisarius conquered the city in 540. His mausoleum is one of the finest monuments in Ravenna. Unlike all the other contemporary buildings in Ravenna, which were made of brick, the Mausoleum of Theodoric was built completely from fine quality stone ashlars. Possibly as a reference to the Goths' tradition of an origin in Scandinavia, the architect decorated the frieze with a pattern found in 5th- and 6th-century Scandinavian metal adornments.

Rome
The Palace of Domitian on the Palatine Hill was reconstructed, using the receipts from a specially levied tax; while the city walls of Rome were rebuilt, a feat celebrated by the Senate of Rome with a gilded statue of Theodoric. The Senate's Curia, the Theatre of Pompey, the city aqueducts, sewers and a granary were refurbished and repaired and statues were set up in the Flavian Amphitheatre.

Religion

In 522 the philosopher Boethius became his magister officiorum (head of all the government and court services). Boethius was a Roman aristocrat and Christian humanist, who was also a philosopher, poet, theologian, mathematician, astronomer, translator and commentator on Aristotle and other Greek luminaries. It is hard to overestimate this one-time servant and eventual victim of Theodoric for his influence on philosophy, particularly Christian philosophy, throughout the Middle Ages. Boethius' treatises and commentaries became textbooks for medieval students, and the great Greek philosophers were unknown except for his Latin translations. The execution of Boethius did nothing to dissipate tensions between Arians and Catholics but merely raised additional questions about barbarian imperial legitimacy.

Theodoric was of the Arian (nontrinitarian) faith, and in his final years he was no longer the disengaged Arian patron of religious toleration that he had seemed earlier in his reign. "Indeed, his death cut short what could well have developed into a major persecution of Catholic churches in retaliation for measures taken by Justinian in Constantinople against Arians there."
Despite the Byzantine caesaropapism, which conflated imperial and ecclesiastical authority in the same person—whereby Theodoric's Arian beliefs were tolerated under two separate emperors—the fact remained that to most clergy across the Eastern Empire, Theodoric was a heretic. At the end of his reign quarrels arose with his Roman subjects and the Byzantine emperor Justin I over the matter of Arianism. These quarrels ultimately led to the martyrdom of Boethius and Pope John I by starvation in 524 and 526, respectively. Relations between the two realms deteriorated, although Theodoric's military abilities dissuaded the Byzantines from waging war against him. After his death, that reluctance faded quickly.

Legacy
Seeking to restore the glory of ancient Rome, Theodoric ruled Italy during one of its most peaceful and prosperous periods and was accordingly hailed as a new Trajan and Valentinian I for his building efforts and his religious toleration. His far-sighted goals included taking what was best from Roman culture and combining it with Gothic energy and physical power as a way into the future. Relatively amicable relations between Goths and Romans also make Theodoric's kingdom notable. Memories of his reign made him a hero of medieval German legends, as Dietrich von Bern, where the two figures have represented the same person.

Medieval reception

Theodoric is an important figure in Germanic heroic legend as the character Dietrich von Bern, known in Old Norse as Þjóðrekr or Þiðrekr, and Old English as Þēodrīc. In German legends, Dietrich becomes an exile from his native kingdom of Lombardy, fighting with the help of Etzel against his usurping uncle, Ermenrich. Only the Old High German Hildebrandslied still contains Odoacer as Dietrich's antagonist. The 13th century Norse Þiðreks saga, based on lost Low German sources, moves the location of Dietrich's life to Westphalia and northern Germany. The legends paint a generally positive picture of Dietrich, with only some influence visible from the negative traditions of the church.

See also

 Alboin
 Alfred the Great
 Ardaric
 Charlemagne
 Clovis I
 Ermanaric
 Gaiseric
 Hermeric
 Liutprand, King of the Lombards
 Liuvigild
 Theodoric I (Visigothic king)
 Anicius Manlius Severinus Boethius
 Odoacer
 Ostrogothic Kingdom
 Totila

Notes

References

Sources

Further reading
 Andreas Goltz, Barbar – König – Tyrann. Das Bild Theoderichs des Großen in der Überlieferung des 5. bis 9. Jahrhunderts (Berlin: de Gruyter 2008) (Millenium-Studien zu Kultur und Geschichte des ersten Jahrtausends n. Chr., 12).
 
 
 
 
 
 
 Theodoric the Great at MiddleAges.net
 Theodoric the Goth, 1897, by Thomas Hodgkin, from Project Gutenberg
 Medieval Lands Project on Theodoric the Great, King of Italy

External links

 
Amali dynasty
Burials in Italy
German heroic legends
Gothic warriors
Imperial Roman consuls
Magistri militum
Medieval legends
Ostrogothic kings
454 births
526 deaths
5th-century Ostrogothic people
5th-century kings of Italy
5th-century monarchs in Europe
5th-century Roman consuls
6th-century Arian Christians
6th-century Ostrogothic people
6th-century kings of Italy
6th-century monarchs in Europe